Abraham Lincoln is a 1918 play by John Drinkwater about the 16th President of the United States. Drinkwater's first great success, it premiered in England in 1918. The 1919 Broadway production starred Frank McGlynn.

Production

A rare depiction of events in the life of a U.S. President by a British playwright, Abraham Lincoln was a great success in its day. The play covers events in Lincoln's Presidency from his election in 1860 to his assassination, but omits most of the events in his private life.
Abraham Lincoln was first produced in October 1918 at the Birmingham Repertory Theatre, of which John Drinkwater was the artistic director. Arnold Bennett and Nigel Playfair acquired the play and its company for the suburban Hammersmith Playhouse, where Abraham Lincoln became a sensational success with London audiences. Irish actor William J. Rea starred.

Produced by William Harris Jr., the Broadway production of Abraham Lincoln opened December 15, 1919, at the Cort Theatre, and ran for 193 performances. Lester Lonergan directed a cast including the following:

 Leonard Mudie as Chronicler
 Florence Johns as Susan, a Maid
 Winifred Hanley as Mrs. Lincoln
 Frank McGlynn as Mr. Lincoln
 Forrest Davis as William Tucker, a Merchant
 Duncan Cherry as Elias Price, a Lay Preacher
 Penwood Batkins as James MacIntosh, a Journalist
 John S. O'Brien as William H. Seward, Secretary of State
 Charles Fleming as Johnson White, Confederate Commissioner
 William R. Randall as Caleb Jennings, Confederate Commissioner
 Paul Byron as John Hay, Lincoln's Secretary
 Frank E. Jamison as Salmon P. Chase, Secretary of the Treasury
 Herbert Curtis as Simon Cameron, Secretary of War, 1862
 Alfred Moore as Gideon Welles, Secretary of the Navy
 William A. Norton as Burnet Hook, a Member of the Cabinet
 David Landau as Edwin M. Stanton, Secretary of War, 1865
 J. Philip Jerome as Messenger
 Mary Horne Morrison as Mrs. Goliath Blow
 Charles S. Gilpin as William Custis
 Albert Phillips as General Ulysses S. Grant, Commander of the Federal Army
 George Williams as Captain Mallins, Grant's aide-de-camp
 Charles P. Bates as Dennis, an Orderly
 Raymond Hackett as William Scott, a Soldier
 Frank Ginter as General Meade, Field Commander, Federal Forces
 Thomas Irwin as Captain Stone, Meade's aide-de-camp
 James Durkin as General Robert E. Lee, Commander of the Confederate Army
 J. Paul Jones as John Wilkes Booth

Adaptations
In 1924, a two-reel sound film version of the play was filmed by Lee De Forest in his Phonofilm sound-on-film process. Frank McGlynn reprised his Broadway role.

In Czechoslovakia the play was broadcast on radio on November 8, 1937. Directed by Miloslav Jares, the production starred Frantisek Salzer in the role of Abraham Lincoln.

Abraham Lincoln was adapted as the sixth episode of the CBS Radio series The Mercury Theatre on the Air, broadcast August 15, 1938. The cast included Orson Welles (Abraham Lincoln), Ray Collins (Grant), Edward Jerome (General Lee) George Coulouris (Hook), Joseph Cotten (Seward), Carl Frank (Scott), Karl Swenson (Hay), William Alland (Dennis) and Agnes Moorehead (Mrs. Lincoln).

On May 26, 1952, the play was presented on television on the anthology series Studio One. Starring Robert Pastene and Judith Evelyn, the TV adaptation was notable for featuring actor James Dean in the small but significant role of William Scott, a Union soldier court-martialed and condemned to death for falling asleep on watch. The live production survived on kinescope and is available at the Internet Archive.

See also
 Abraham Lincoln (1924 film short), two-reel short film made by Lee DeForest in Phonofilm

References

External links

 Abraham Lincoln (1919) at the Internet Archive
Abraham Lincoln at Project Gutenberg
 "Abraham Lincoln" (August 15, 1938) on The Mercury Theatre on the Air, starring Orson Welles (Indiana University Bloomington)
"Abraham Lincoln" (May 26, 1952) on Studio One (Internet Archive)

English plays
Abraham Lincoln in art
1918 plays
American plays adapted into films
Plays set in the 19th century
Fiction set in the 1860s